Nagar is a village in the Phillaur tehsil of Jalandhar District of the Indian state of Punjab. The village is administered by the Sarpanch, an elected representative.

Demographics 
According to the 2011 Census, Nagar has a population of 3187. 1622 are males, while 1565 are females. Nagar has a literacy rate of 81.80%, higher than the average literacy rate of Punjab.

Most villagers belong to a Schedule Caste (SC), comprising 56.07% of the total.

Landmarks 
The area has several religious sites famous. These include: Gurudwara Shri Guru Nanak Singh Sabha, Gurudwara Sahid Baba Dalel Singh Ji, Gurdwara Dera Sahib Baba Bhadbhag Singh Ji, Dera St Baba Mela Ram Ji, Shiv mandir temple.

Facilities 
The village has two banks: the HDFC Bank  and Canara Bank.

Education 
The village has a co-ed primary school (Pri Nagar School) and a girls-only primary and secondary school (Ghs Nagar (G) School). Schools in Nagar provide a mid-day meal as per the Indian Midday Meal Scheme.

Transport 
Phillaur Junction is the nearest train station. Bhatian Railway Station is  y from the village.

The nearest international airport is located in Chandigarh.

References 

Villages in Jalandhar district
Villages in Phillaur tehsil